This is a list of domain names that sold for $3 million USD or more.

The list is limited to pure domain name and cash-only sales. Sales which included website content or involved equity deals are not listed.

Domain transactions to be completed 

The following domains were purchased through installment and are to be completed in the future:

References 

Most expensive
Domain names, expensive
Lists of most expensive things